KAFC is a commercial Christian contemporary music radio station in Anchorage, Alaska.

KAFC may also refer to:
Kent Athletic F.C.
Kidsgrove Athletic F.C.